The Palestine Center (previously called the Center for Policy Analysis on Palestine until 2002) is an independent educational program based in Foggy Bottom, Washington, D.C. Their focus is on the Israeli–Palestinian conflict and other Middle East issues.

Founding
It was set up in 1991 as an educational component of The Jerusalem Fund for Education and Community Development. The Fund is a 501(c)(3) non-profit grant-making organization operating in the United States. Its founders include the late professors Hisham Sharabi of Georgetown University and Samih Farsoun of American University. Sharabi was a founder of the Center for Contemporary Arab Studies at Georgetown University. The current executive director is Zeina Azzam.

Purpose
The center analyzes relations between the United States and the Middle East with a focus on the Palestinian issue. The center studies specific U.S. policies, publishes reports, briefing, and analysis, and serves as a venue for Palestinian and Arab scholars.

The center also houses the Hisham Sharabi Memorial Library, one of the largest Palestine-centered collections in the United States. The center employs fellows to conduct policy research. It published extensive online audio archives of its events going back to the early 1990s, a blog and a YouTube page to document its on-site events.

Publications
The center has been referenced by diverse news media from the Turkish Weekly to the Washington Times and Christian Science Monitor.

The Palestine Center publishes press releases as mentioned above, as well as articles written by fellows.

Events
The Palestine Center holds weekly events and often invites distinguished speakers. Speakers at the Palestine Center have included former Israeli Knesset member Azmi Bishara, Palestinian diplomat Afif Safieh, Clovis Maksoud, Amb. Nabil Fahmy, Egyptian Ambassador to the United States, Hanan Ashrawi, Palestinian Prime Minister Salam Fayyad, and John Mearsheimer, among others.

See also
 The Jerusalem Fund

Notes

External links
 http://www.palestinecenter.org/

Arab-American culture in Washington, D.C.
Think tanks based in Washington, D.C.
State of Palestine–United States relations
Palestinian-American culture
1991 establishments in Washington, D.C.